A by-election for the seat of Millner in the Northern Territory Legislative Assembly was held on 7 December 1991. The by-election was triggered by the resignation of Labor (ALP) member and Leader of the Opposition Terry Smith. The seat had been held by Smith since a previous by-election in 1981.

Results

References

1991 elections in Australia
Northern Territory by-elections